Sant'Agnello is a comune (municipality) in the Metropolitan City of Naples in the Italian region Campania, located about 25 km southeast of Naples.

Sant'Agnello borders the following municipalities: Piano di Sorrento, Sorrento. It is served by the Circumvesuviana,  a narrow gauge railway that connects to the city of Naples.

Notable people 
 Francis Marion Crawford (1854–1909) an American novelist, lived in Sant'Agnello from 1887 until his death in a small palace known as Villa Crawford.

See also
Sorrentine Peninsula
Amalfi Coast

References

External links

Sant'Agnello Touristic information 

Cities and towns in Campania
Coastal towns in Campania